Robertson Field may refer to:

Airports:
 Robertson Field (Connecticut) in Plainville, Connecticut, United States (FAA: 4B8)
 Robertson Field (North Dakota) in Langdon, North Dakota, United States (FAA: D55)
 Robertson Airfield in Robertson, Western Cape South Africa (ICAO: FARS)

Stadiums:
 Hal Robertson Field at Phillip Satow Stadium in New York, New York, United States